Matej Šakota (born 16 August 2004) is a Bosnian footballer currently playing as a forward for Dinamo Zagreb.

Club career
Born in Mostar, Šakota progressed through the youth academy of Zrinjski Mostar, signing a professional contract with the club in September 2021. On scoring in a 2–0 victory over Sloboda in May 2022, he broke Ivan Bubalo's 26-year-old record to become Zrinjski's youngest ever goalscorer.

In August 2022, he transferred to Croatian side Dinamo Zagreb, signing a five-year contract.

International career
Šakota has been selected and represented Bosnia and Herzegovina at levels Under-15, U16, U17, U18, and has played 20 games for the Under-19 team so far.

Personal life
Šakota's brother, Filip, is also a footballer, and currently plays for the academy of Zrinjski.

Career statistics

Club

Notes

References

2004 births
Living people
People from Mostar
Bosnia and Herzegovina footballers
Bosnia and Herzegovina youth international footballers
Association football forwards
HŠK Zrinjski Mostar players
GNK Dinamo Zagreb players
Bosnia and Herzegovina expatriate footballers
Bosnia and Herzegovina expatriate sportspeople in Croatia
Expatriate footballers in Croatia